Wathod Reservoir is a reservoir within the Manora town, Washim district, Maharashtra, India.
 
Maximum storage capacity is 1.98 MCM . Live storage capacity is 1.7 MCM. Wathod Lake is also a popular tourist attraction for its scenic beauty. There is varied flora and fauna. The water is turbid in rainy session while clear and  transparent in summer.

In 2014 scientists measured all the physical and chemical parameter of Wathod Reservoir and its research exhibit that Wathod Reservoir is still safe for drinking water.

History
Wathod reservoir was constructed as part of irrigation projects by the Government of Maharashtra in 1974.

Reservoirs in Maharashtra
Dams in Washim district
Dams completed in 1974
1974 establishments in Maharashtra
20th-century architecture in India